This is a list of USA Fencing (USFA) Division I national champions. The Division I National Championship in each weapon was contested at Summer Nationals until recently, when it started taking place during the April North American Cup.

Men's Fencing Division I National Champions

Women's Fencing Division I National Champions

Other

References

 

Fencing competitions
Fencing in the United States